The 1890 Cornell Big Red football team was an American football team that represented Cornell University during the 1890 college football season. The team compiled an 7–4 record and outscored all opponents by a combined total of 342 to 134. Cornell's 77–0 loss to Harvard holds the record as the worst defeat in Cornell football history. In second place is a 66–0 loss to Princeton in 2018, 128 years later.

Schedule

References

Cornell
Cornell Big Red football seasons
Cornell Big Red football